Ben Worman (born 30 August 2001) is an English professional footballer who plays as a midfielder for  Cambridge United.

He became the youngest ever player to play for Cambridge United after making his first-team debut in November 2017.

Playing career
Worman came through the youth-team at Cambridge United and made his first-team debut in an EFL Trophy match on 7 November 2017, coming on as an 83rd-minute substitute for Uche Ikpeazu in a 2–0 defeat by Peterborough United at the Abbey Stadium. At the age of 16, this made him the youngest ever player to take part in a competitive match for the "U's"; manager Shaun Derry said that it was a "fantastic" experience for the youngster. In September 2018, following the signing of a three-year professional contract, Worman joined St Neots Town on loan.

On 18 January 2019, Worman joined Bishop's Stortford on a one-month loan deal. The deal was later extended first for a month, and later until the end of the season.

On 21 November 2019, Worman signed for National League South club Chelmsford City on an initial one-month loan deal.

He scored his first goal for Cambridge United on 10 November 2020 in an EFL Trophy group game against Peterborough United.

Statistics

References

2001 births
Living people
English footballers
Association football midfielders
Cambridge United F.C. players
St Neots Town F.C. players
Bishop's Stortford F.C. players
Chelmsford City F.C. players
Weymouth F.C. players
English Football League players
National League (English football) players
Southern Football League players
Isthmian League players